The 2022–23 Coupe de France preliminary rounds, Grand Est is the qualifying competition to decide which teams from the leagues of the Grand Est region of France take part in the main competition from the seventh round.

A total of nineteen teams will qualify from the Grand Est preliminary rounds. 

In 2021–22, ES Thaon progressed furthest in the competition, reaching the round of 32, where they were narrowly beaten in stoppage time by Ligue 1 side Stade de Reims.

Draws and fixtures
On 29 July 2022, the league published the first round draw, made up of 437 ties, and the list of 103 teams exempted to future rounds, thereby confirming that 977 teams from the region had entered.

The league published the second round draw on 23 August 2022, with 45 teams from Régional 2 entering at this stage. The third round draw was published on 6 September 2022, With 49 teams from Régional 1 and Championnat National 3 entering the competition, and 145 ties drawn.

The fourth round draw was published on 15 September 2022, with the three teams from Championnat National 2 entering at this stage.

The fifth round draw was published on 28 September 2022, and saw the two teams from Championnat National entering the competition. The sixth round draw was published on 11 October 2022.

First round
These matches were played on 19 and 20 August 2022.

Second round
These matches were played on 1, 2, 3 and 4 September 2022.

Third round
These matches were played on 8, 10 and 11 September 2022.

Fourth round
These matches were played on 23, 24 and 25 September 2022.

Fifth round
These matches were played on 8 and 9 October 2022.

Sixth round
These matches were played on 15 and 16 October 2022.

References

Preliminary rounds